Ressa may refer to the following notable people:
Given name
Ressa Kania Dewi (born 1994), Indonesian swimmer

Surname
Maria Ressa (born 1963), Filipino-American journalist and a Nobel Peace laureate